Hillview is a home rule-class city in Bullitt County, Kentucky, in the United States. The population was 8,172 at the 2010 census. The primary road through the area is Kentucky Route 61 (the Preston Highway).

Long a rural farming community, Hillview was connected to what became Interstate 65 in 1954 and grew in the 1950s and 1960s as a suburb of Louisville. Its larger subdivisions included Maryville, Overdale, and Lone Acres, and they incorporated in 1974 to form the present city.

Geography
The northern border of Hillview is the southern border of Louisville-Jefferson County. Hillview is bordered to the east by Pioneer Village, and other nearby cities include Hunters Hollow to the west, Hebron Estates to the southeast, and Fox Chase to the south. The unincorporated community of Brooks is to the west across I-65.

Demographics
As of the census of 2000, there were 7,037 people, 2,411 households, and 2,013 families residing in the city. The racial makeup of the city was 97.90% White, 0.37% African American, 0.47% Native American, 0.28% Asian, 0.11% from other races, and 0.87% from two or more races. Hispanic or Latino of any race were 0.70% of the population.

There were 2,411 households, out of which 41.6% had children under the age of 18 living with them, 66.6% were married couples living together, 11.5% had a female householder with no husband present, and 16.5% were non-families. 13.1% of all households were made up of individuals, and 3.2% had someone living alone who was 65 years of age or older. The average household size was 2.92 and the average family size was 3.16.

In the city, the population was spread out, with 28.7% under the age of 18, 8.6% from 18 to 24, 34.9% from 25 to 44, 22.3% from 45 to 64, and 5.5% who were 65 years of age or older. The median age was 32 years. For every 100 females, there were 100.2 males. For every 100 females age 18 and over, there were 98.1 males.

The median income for a household in the city was $42,743, and the median income for a family was $45,594. Males had a median income of $33,962 versus $22,027 for females. The per capita income for the city was $15,832. About 5.3% of families and 7.1% of the population were below the poverty line, including 9.0% of those under age 18 and 9.3% of those age 65 or over.

Education
Hillview has a public library, a branch of the Bullitt County Public Library.

References

External links
City of Hillview official website
"Hillview: Land of Cornfields Became a Kind of Battlefield as Growth Spurred Efforts by Some to Incorporate" — Article by Joseph Gerth of The Courier-Journal

Cities in Bullitt County, Kentucky
Cities in Kentucky
Louisville metropolitan area
Populated places established in 1974
1974 establishments in Kentucky